Henry McKop (born 8 July 1967) is a retired football defender.

During his club career, Mckop played for Zimbabwe Saints, Bonner SC, Bristol City, Shelbourne, Vorwärts Steyr, Mamelodi Sundowns, Spartak Pretoria, Wits University and AmaZulu. He also played for the Zimbabwe national football team

External links
 
 

1967 births
Living people
Zimbabwean footballers
Zimbabwean expatriate footballers
Zimbabwe international footballers
Association football defenders
Bristol City F.C. players
Shelbourne F.C. players
SK Vorwärts Steyr players
Mamelodi Sundowns F.C. players
Bidvest Wits F.C. players
AmaZulu F.C. players
Expatriate association footballers in the Republic of Ireland
Expatriate footballers in England
Expatriate footballers in Germany
Expatriate footballers in Austria
Expatriate soccer players in South Africa